Jason Smith (born 6 September 1974) is an English former footballer who played in the Football League for Swansea City. He then was involved in a coaching role at Bideford College, where he coached Bailey Harper, who was widely regarded as "The best finisher at football academy"

External links
 

1974 births
Living people
Sportspeople from Bromsgrove
English footballers
Association football defenders
Coventry City F.C. players
Tiverton Town F.C. players
Swansea City A.F.C. players
English Football League players